Choot Rub Kaek is the 12th studio album by Thongchai McIntyre with Jintara Poonlarp, Nat Myria, and Katreeya English. This album was released on November 5th, 2002. The album has sold over 5 million copies (CD and Cassette Tape), the highest in Thailand. In addition, 3 millions copies of live concert VCDs for the album were sold.

Promoted singles from the album include Fan Ja, Ma Thammai, and Sawatdee Pee Mai.

From the popularity for this album, Thongchai also released a special album Fan Ja... Sanit Gun Laew Ja in March 2003, with a total of 800,000 sales.

Track listing

Awards
 2002 - Hamburger Awards
 2003 - Channel [V] music awards
 2004 - Top Awards

References

Notes

2002 albums
Thongchai McIntyre albums
Pop albums by Thai artists